John Williams Farm, also known as the Davis B. Williams Farm and Stinson Markley Residence, is a historic farm complex and national historic district located in Charlestown Township, Chester County, Pennsylvania. It includes five contributing buildings and one contributing site.  They are the farmhouse (c. 1800, 1827), bank barn (1834), garden and springhouse, and wagon house, and the remains of the "necessary" and animal pen.

It was added to the National Register of Historic Places in 1978.

References

Farms on the National Register of Historic Places in Pennsylvania
Historic districts on the National Register of Historic Places in Pennsylvania
Houses in Chester County, Pennsylvania
National Register of Historic Places in Chester County, Pennsylvania